Adalbert I of Vermandois (the Pious) (–), was the son of Herbert II of Vermandois and Adela of France. Born about 915, he succeeded his father as Count of Vermandois in 946.

Life
Adalbert, also known as Albert, assisted his brother Count Herbert in his marriage to Queen "Ottobega" (Eadgifu of Wessex), the mother of Louis IV of France. Adalbert's men escorted (some sources say abducted) Ottobega from the convent in Laon where she resided to her marriage with Herbert, which in turn enraged King Louis. There was a prior history between Louis IV and the House of Vermandois as Adalbert's father Herbert II was responsible for the capture, imprisonment and death in captivity of Louis's father King Charles the Simple as well as Louis's own exile to England as an infant. Louis confiscated his mother's holdings, the abbey of Saint Mary in Laon which he gave to his wife Gerberga of Saxony and the royal fisc of Attigny. In 957, Adalbert and his brother, Robert Count of Meaux and Troyes, were adherents of King Lothair of France.

When Charles, Duke of Lower Lorraine decided to assert his rights to the throne he was aided by Albert and Albert's two nephews, Herbert III, Count of Meaux and Odo I, Count of Blois. The two aided Charles in his plots and continued to make trouble for the new king even after Charles was captured and imprisoned.

Albert was slow to acknowledge the election of Hugh Capet as King of the Franks. On learning that Hugh intended to attack him, Albert sent Dudo of Saint-Quentin to Normandy to see if Duke Richard I, Duke of Normandy would use his influence to keep the peace between them, which apparently the duke did. For his part Hugh Capet had been suspicious that Albert was about to rebel against him. Albert, Count of Vermandois, died  and was succeeded by his son Herbert III.

Family
In 954 he married Gerberge of Lorraine († 978), daughter of Giselbert, Duke of Lorraine, and his wife Gerberga of Saxony.

Their children were:
 Herbert III of Vermandois
 perhaps: Otto I, Count of Chiny (–987)
 Eudes of Vermandois (–)
 Liudolfe of Vermandois, Bishop of Noyon and Tournai (–986)

Notes

References

Sources

Herbertien dynasty
910s births
987 deaths
Year of birth uncertain